Haileybury may refer to:

Australia
 Haileybury (Melbourne), a school in Melbourne, Victoria, Australia
Haileybury Rendall School, an offshoot in Berrimah, North Territory, Australia

China 

 Haileybury International School, an international school in Tianjin.

Canada
 Haileybury, Ontario, part of Temiskaming Shores, a city in Ontario
 Haileybury School of Mines, a school of Northern College, Ontario

Kazakhstan
 Haileybury Almaty, an independent school in Almaty, an offshoot of Haileybury College (UK)
 Haileybury Astana, an independent school in Astana, an offshoot of Haileybury College (UK)

United Kingdom
East India Company College, Haileybury, Hertfordshire, England (1806–1858) was the training establishment for the Honourable East India Company
Haileybury College, opened in 1862 on the site of the East India Company College
Haileybury and Imperial Service College, formed by the 1942 merger of Haileybury College and Imperial Service College
 Haileybury Turnford, an academy in Cheshunt, Hertfordshire, sponsored by Haileybury College
Lambrook Haileybury, a prep school in Berkshire

See also